Xyphosia is a genus of the family Tephritidae, better known as fruit flies.

Species
Xyphosia conspicua (Loew, 1869)
Xyphosia laticauda (Meigen, 1826)
Xyphosia malaisei Hering, 1938
Xyphosia miliaria (Schrank, 1781)
Xyphosia orientalis Hering, 1936
Xyphosia punctipennis Hendel, 1927
Xyphosia punctigera (Coquillett, 1898)

References

Tephritinae
Tephritidae genera
Taxa named by Jean-Baptiste Robineau-Desvoidy
Diptera of Europe
Diptera of Asia